Joseph Lubin may refer to:

 Joseph Lubin (accountant) (1899–1983), American accountant
 Joseph Lubin (entrepreneur) (born 1964), Canadian entrepreneur